The GIUK gap (sometimes written G-I-UK) is an area in the northern Atlantic Ocean that forms a naval choke point. Its name is an acronym for Greenland, Iceland, and the United Kingdom, the gap being the two stretches of open ocean between these three landmasses. It separates the Norwegian Sea and the North Sea from the open Atlantic Ocean. The term is typically used in relation to military topics. The area has for some nations been considered strategically important since the beginning of the 20th century.

Importance for the navy from the United Kingdom

The GIUK gap is particularly important to the navy from the United Kingdom, as any attempt by northern European forces to break into the open Atlantic would have to be made either through the heavily defended English Channel, one of the world's busiest seaways, or through one of the exits on either side of Iceland. As the British also control the strategic port of Gibraltar at the entrance to the Mediterranean, this means Spain, France, and Portugal are the only Continental European countries that possess direct access to the Atlantic Ocean that cannot easily be blocked at a choke point by the Royal Navy.

History
Since the beginning of the 20th century, the exploitation of the GIUK gap by northern forces and measures to patrol and secure the gap by opposing forces have played an important role in naval and in overall military planning.

World War II
From the start of World War II in 1939, German ships used the gap to break out from their bases in northern Germany (and from occupied Norway after April 1940) with a view to attacking Allied shipping convoys, but Allied blocking efforts in the North Sea and in the GIUK gap impeded such break-outs. British forces occupied the Faroe Islands in April 1940, and Iceland in May 1940; the United States took over effective control of Greenland in 1940. But the German  profited greatly from the fall of France in June 1940, after which German submarines could operate from bases on the French coast.

The origin of the term "gap" dates to this period, when there was a gap in air coverage known as the Mid-Atlantic gap or the "Greenland air gap". This gap was an area that land-based aircraft could not reach and where, as a result, they could not carry out their anti-submarine duties.

Cold War
The GIUK gap again became the focus of naval planning in the 1950s, as it represented the only available outlet into the Atlantic Ocean for Soviet submarines operating from their bases on the Kola Peninsula.  NATO worried that if the Cold War "turned hot", naval convoys reinforcing Europe from the U.S. would suffer unacceptable losses if Soviet submarines could operate in the North Atlantic. The United States and Britain based much of their post-war naval strategy on blocking the gap, installing a chain of underwater listening posts right across it during the 1950s – an example of a SOSUS "sound surveillance system". This deployment of sonar surveillance in the gap, and elsewhere, hampered the Soviet Northern Fleet's ability to deploy its submarines without detection.

The Royal Navy's primary mission during the Cold War, excluding its nuclear deterrent role, involved anti-submarine warfare (ASW). The development of the  ASW aircraft carriers stemmed from this doctrine: their primary mission involved anti-submarine warfare using Sea King helicopters. The Type 23 frigate originated as a pure ASW platform; its mission expanded following the Falklands War of 1982.

The largest Russian submarine drills through the GIUK gap were operations Aport and Atrina, in 1985 and 1987, respectively, when the Soviets deployed several SSNs near the U.S. coast before the 1985 Gorbachev–Reagan meeting.

The Soviets planned to use the GIUK gap to intercept any NATO ships, especially aircraft carriers, heading towards the Soviet Union. Ships and submarines as well as Tupolev Tu-142 maritime-surveillance aircraft aimed to track any threatening ships.

The advent of longer-ranged Soviet submarine-launched ballistic missiles (SLBMs) allowed the Soviet Navy to deploy their ballistic missile submarine (SSBNs) within protected bastions in the Barents Sea and reduced their need to transit the GIUK gap. The much reduced, post-Cold War Russian Navy has even less need to transit the GIUK gap.

Crossing the GIUK gap was a major strategic move for Ocean Venture in 1992, in which 84 NATO ships, including 4 US aircraft carriers, departed from their usual August exercise pattern, deployed a decoy south toward the mid-Atlantic, and then entered waters in a move that had historically been associated with a risk of destabilizing détente.

Post-Cold War
In late October 2019, a week before Commander of the Northern Fleet Aleksandr Moiseyev and Russian Foreign Minister Sergey Lavrov met their Norwegian counterparts in Kirkenes, Norway, ten submarines of Russia's Northern Fleet, among them two diesel-electric and eight non-strategic nuclear, left their homebases in the Kola Peninsula to participate in submarine drills that were the largest, on the Russian side, since Cold War operations Aport and Atrina.
The main task of the submarines was reportedly testing Russian ability to breach the GIUK gap undetected and sail into the Atlantic Ocean. The drills were expected to last up to two months.

Bird migration
The GIUK gap is also a route for migratory birds such as the northern wheatear to cross the Atlantic to reach Greenland and eastern Canada.

In popular culture
 The 1960 British war film Sink the Bismarck! discusses the strategic importance of the GIUK gap during World War II naval operations in the Atlantic theatre, and depicts the Battle of the Denmark Strait between British and German forces. It is based on the novel The Last Nine Days of the Bismarck by C. S. Forester.
 The GIUK line is mentioned in the film The Bedford Incident.  
 In Tom Clancy's first novel, The Hunt for Red October, the line was used to detect Soviet submarines entering the North Atlantic in pursuit of the rogue Typhoon-class submarine Red October, whose officers were defecting to the United States with clandestine stealth technology. The event causes significant political and military tension between the United States and the Soviet Union. The film adaptation also references the gap, with National Security Advisor Dr. Jeffrey Pelt (played by Richard Jordan) saying to the Soviet ambassador "Your aircraft have dropped enough sonar buoys so that a man could walk from Greenland to Iceland to Scotland without getting his feet wet."
 In Clancy's second novel, Red Storm Rising, the line is featured more prominently after a war breaks out between NATO and the Warsaw Pact. The Soviet Union launches a surprise attack on the NATO airbase NAS Keflavik and invades Iceland. This causes the line to be destroyed, creating a gap in NATO's surveillance and allowing the Soviet Navy to enter the North Atlantic. The subsequent Soviet submarine attacks and air raids cause serious damage to Merchant Marine ships and naval vessels in Atlantic convoys, hindering NATO's war effort during the defense against the less-successful Soviet invasion of West Germany.
 Early editions of the Harpoon naval warfare simulation were based around defending the GIUK Gap. Tom Clancy used the simulation to test the naval battles for Red Storm Rising.
 The location of Iceland in the gap made it a participant in the Cold War and a target for a nuclear strike, especially through the introduction of the aforementioned atomic bomber NATO base. Halldór Laxness dramatized the tension of these geopolitics from the perspective of an Icelandic maid in the novel The Atom Station.

See also
 
 
 
 
 
 
 
 
 
 
 

Land:

References

Atlantic Ocean
Battle of the Atlantic
Naval warfare
Soviet Union–United Kingdom relations
Iceland–United Kingdom relations
Soviet Union–United States relations
Military operations involving the Warsaw Pact
NATO
History of the Royal Navy
Naval history of Canada
History of the French Navy
Naval history of Germany
Naval history of the Netherlands
History of the United States Navy
Spanish Navy
Portuguese Navy
Soviet Navy
Cold War in popular culture